was a Japanese samurai retainer of the Mito Domain, military strategist, and student of the Hirata school of kokugaku.

Biography
He later adopted the  name "Hyōbu".

In 1809, Yamakuni succeeded as head of the Yamakuni family and was assigned to the Mito guard division.

In 1830, he was recognized by Tokugawa Nariaki and became a metsuke. At that time Yamakuni was involved in the military reform of the Mito Domain. In 1838, Yamakuni was placed under house arrest for unclear reasons, but was quickly released and reappointed as a military officer in 1840.

In 1846, when Nariaki was sentenced to house arrest by the central government, Yamakuni too was arrested due to his political affiliation with him. In 1849, he was pardoned.

In 1853, in the aftermath of the arrival of the United States, Nariaki was summoned by the shogunate to Edo in order to serve as an advisor on matters of naval defense. Yamakuni accompanied him to the capital as a military attaché, and became well known for his outspoken advocacy for a network of coastal fortifications to deter a European or American invasion. He also advocated a strategy of luring future Western invasion forces into the mountainous interior of Honshū, the topography of which the Western powers were mostly unfamiliar with at that time, where they would become surrounded and could be overwhelmed by smaller Japanese domainal armies.

Emperor Kōmei was outraged by the Shogunate's acquiescence to the United States' demands, and issued a secret missive to the Mito authorities to "reorganize" the Shogunate. However, the Shogunate detected this and its conspirators, including Yamakuni, were arrested. Yamakuni was released after Nariaki's death in 1860.

By 1862, Yamakuni had returned to his post as metsuke.

In 1864, during the Mito Rebellion, he was ordered to pacify the Tengutō encamped on Mount Taiheizan under the command of Takeda Kōunsai. Yamakuni sympathized with the rebels, and advised them to relocate to a more defensible position on Mount Tsukuba. Upon his return, he was imprisoned once again for his disobedience. However, when Yamakuni became aware that Matsudaira Yorinori, lord of the Shishido Domain, joined Takeda's force in the rebellion, he broke himself out of prison and joined Yorinori's division. After Yorinori committed seppuku, Yamakuni was incorporated into the Tengutō remnants led by Takeda. Takeda and Yamakuni intended to proceed to Kyoto in order to make a direct appeal to the Imperial Court, but the remnants were captured in Tsuruga, Echizen Province, and both were sentenced to death along with the other leaders of the uprising in 1865. Yamakuni's entire family was punished as well; his sons were executed and his daughters were condemned to life imprisonment.

References 

1793 births
1865 deaths
Samurai
Military strategists
Japanese nationalists
Japanese Shintoists
Kokugaku scholars
Executed Japanese people
People executed by decapitation